WWIS-FM (99.7 FM) is a radio station broadcasting a classic country format. It is licensed to Black River Falls, Wisconsin, United States, the station serves the La Crosse, Wisconsin, area. The station is currently owned by WWIS Radio, Inc., and features programming from CBS News Radio and Westwood One.

Current programming 
WWIS-FM carries Milwaukee Brewers baseball, as well as basketball and football from the University of Wisconsin.

References

External links

WIS-FM
Classic country radio stations in the United States